R-17 is a 2001 Japanese TV series broadcast on TV Asahi with Chiaki Kuriyama as Saori Maruyama, Miki Nakatani and Yuma Ishigaki. It is based on the manga Confidential Confessions by Reiko Momochi.

Cast
Miki Nakatani as Megumi Moriyama
Kaori Momoi
Seiichi Tanabe
Yū Kurosawa (Akira Kurosawa's granddaughter)
Masahiko Nishimura
episodes 1 and 2
Chiaki Kuriyama as Saori Maruyama
Yutaka Matsushige
Mariko Tsutsui
episodes 3 and 4
Asami Mizukawa as Keiko Miyauchi
episodes 5 and 6
Aoi Miyazaki as Yukari Nomura
episodes 7, 8 and 9
Mika Mifune (Toshiro Mifune's daughter) as Kyoko Nishimoto

External links
 R-17 on IMDb

2001 Japanese television series debuts
Japanese drama television series
Japanese-language films
TV Asahi television dramas